Kevin Gray (February 25, 1958 – February 11, 2013) was an American actor who worked primarily in musical theater.

Gray, a graduate of Duke University, played Kayama in the 1985 Broadway revival of Stephen Sondheim's Pacific Overtures. He was the youngest actor to play the title role in The Phantom of the Opera on Broadway and in the U.S. national tour, and received The Carbonell Award for his portrayal.

Gray played the King of Siam in the 1996 Broadway revival of The King and I, and in the UK touring production. He played Pontius Pilate in the revival of Jesus Christ Superstar and Gaylord Ravenal in Harold Prince's production of Show Boat. He also performed in productions of the Portland Stage Company, Boston Shakespeare Company, Stonington Shakespeare Company, The MUNY, and The Mount Gretna Playhouse.

He received the Dora Mavor Moore Award for his role as The Engineer in the Toronto production of Miss Saigon and the Drama-Logue Award for his same portrayal in the Los Angeles production.

Gray's television roles include the daytime dramas Ryan's Hope and Guiding Light and the prime-time series Law & Order: Special Victims Unit, Law & Order: Criminal Intent, Miami Vice and The Equalizer. He co-starred in the film White Hot.

Gray was a professor at Rollins College until 2011, when he went to the University of Hartford's Hartt School. At Rollins he taught Meisner Technique Acting for Musical Theatre. He served as Associate Professor of Theatre at the Hartt School.

Gray was married to Dodie Pettit, whom he met while acting in The Phantom of the Opera on Broadway. Gray and his wife performed together on two recordings: Voices of Broadway, a joint venture with Broadway Cares/Equity Fights AIDS, and Songs from the Journey.

Gray died suddenly of a heart attack on February 11, 2013, fourteen days away from his 55th birthday, and is survived by his wife Dodie Pettit.

References

External links

 
 
 

Dora Mavor Moore Award winners
20th-century American male actors
Duke University alumni
University of Hartford Hartt School faculty
Rollins College faculty
1958 births
2013 deaths
Place of birth missing
Place of death missing